At the 1930 British Empire Games, the wrestling competition featured men's contests in seven weight classes.

Medal summary

See also

References

Commonwealth Games Medallists - Wrestling. GBR Athletics. Retrieved on 2010-07-21.

1930 British Empire Games events
1930
1930 in sports
1930 in sport wrestling